Shin Hye-sung, lead vocalist of the Korean boyband Shinhwa, has had a solo singing career concurrent with his Shinhwa activities since 2005.  His discography consists of seven Korean-language studio albums, one Japanese-language studio albums, and two compilation albums, one each released in Korea and in Japan.  He also released re-recordings of six of his previous duets with new singers in 2014, as part of his "Once Again" project, as well as recorded 12 songs for soundtracks.

Albums

Studio albums

Live albums

Compilation albums

Extended plays

Singles

Video albums

Soundtracks

Featured artist

Notes
 A  The Recording Industry Association Korea (RIAK) tracked physical album, EP, and singles sales and released a consolidated sales and ranking chart monthly from January 1999 to September 2008.  It did not track digital sales.
 B  The Gaon Music Chart began releasing data in 2010 after the Recording Industry Association Korea stopped compiling data in October 2008. Online sources for charts released after September 2008 and before January 2010 are currently unavailable.

References

External links
 Official Korean Website 
 Official Japanese Website 

Discographies of South Korean artists
Shinhwa